Amabel Williams-Ellis (née Mary Annabel Nassau Strachey; 10 May 1894 – 27 August 1984) was an English writer, critic, and early member of the Bloomsbury Group. As well as her own writings, Williams-Ellis was a prolific editor, translator, and anthologist, compiling collections of fairy stories, folk tales, and science fiction.

Life 
Amabel Nassau Strachey was born at Newlands Corner, near Guildford, Surrey, to journalist and newspaper proprietor John Strachey and Amy (née Simpson). Her cousin was Lytton Strachey, and her childhood described as 'glittering and comfortable'.

During World War I, Amabel served as a Voluntary Aid Detachment nurse, which partly inspired an increasing interest in science and anatomy. This led in turn to her scientific writings for children, particularly on notable discoveries and responses to the typical inquiries of children.

On 31 July 1915, Amabel married Clough Williams-Ellis, an architect, with whom she collaborated on a history of the Tank Corps. The couple also worked together on The Pleasures of Architecture (1924), and other works. They had three children: a son and two daughters. Their daughter, Susan Caroline Williams-Ellis (1918–2007) was a successful ceramics designer and manufacturer. Their son was killed during World War II.

Between 1922-23, she was literary editor of The Spectator. Attracted to socialism, Amabel Williams-Ellis described herself as a 'class traitor'.

Works 
Over the course of her life, Amabel Williams-Ellis wrote more than 40 books. These included novels, books for children, and histories. She wrote regularly for periodicals, and edited multiple volumes of folk legends, fairy tales, and science fiction. She was significantly inspired by the writer and explorer Mary Kingsley, who she had met in childhood, and who she described as 'an anthropologist before anthropology'. The Times described Amabel Williams-Ellis as someone who 'wrote books to find things out, and seemed prepared to take on anything.'

Death 
Amabel Williams-Ellis died on 27 August 1984, at the age of 90. Shortly before her death, she published a memoir: All Stracheys Are Cousins. This showed, wrote The Times, that she was:an undiminished optimist who had lived a busy and a happy life, and enjoyed her second living of it on the page.

Publications 
 The Tank Corps (1919) with Clough Williams-Ellis
 An anatomy of poetry (1922)
 The pleasures of architecture (1924) with Clough Williams-Ellis
 Men who found out: stories of great scientific discoverers (1929)
 The exquisite tragedy; an intimate life of John Ruskin (1929)
 The voyage of the Beagle; adapted from the narratives and letters of Charles Darwin and Capt. Fitz Roy (1931)
 The art of being a woman (1951)
 Fairy tales from the British Isles (1960)
 Darwin's moon: a biography of Alfred Russel Wallace (1966)
 Old World & New World fairy tales (1966)

References

External links 
 Works by Amabel Williams-Ellis at WorldCat
 Works by Amabel Williams-Ellis at Internet Archive

1894 births
1984 deaths
Strachey family
English women writers
Anthologists
Bloomsbury Group
World War I nurses
20th-century English women